Jawahar Navodaya Vidyalaya, North Sikkim or locally known as JNV Phodong is a boarding, co-educational  school in North Sikkim district of Sikkim state in India. Navodaya Vidyalayas are funded by the Indian Ministry of Human Resources Development and administered  by Navodaya Vidyalaya Smiti, an autonomous body under the ministry. Navodaya Vidyalayas offer free education to talented children from Class VI to XII.

History 
The school was established in 1993, and is a part of Jawahar Navodaya Vidyalaya schools. This school is administered and monitored by Shillong regional office of Navodaya Vidyalaya Smiti.

Admission 
Admission to JNV Phodong at class VI level is made through selection test conducted by Navodaya Vidyalaya Smiti. The information about test is disseminated and advertised in district by the office of North Sikkim district magistrate (Collector), who is also the chairperson of Vidyalya Management Committee.

Affiliations 
JNV North Sikkim is affiliated to Central Board of Secondary Education with affiliation number 1840002.

See also 
 Jawahar Navodaya Vidyalaya, East Sikkim
 Jawahar Navodaya Vidyalaya, West Sikkim
 Jawahar Navodaya Vidyalaya, South Sikkim
 List of JNV schools

References

External links 

 Official Website of JNV North Sikkim

High schools and secondary schools in Sikkim
North Sikkim
Educational institutions established in 1993
1993 establishments in Sikkim